A locale (translated as "local" or "place"), is the main local organizational unit of the 'Ndrangheta with jurisdiction over criminal activities in an entire town or an area in a large urban center.

A locale is usually made up by one 'ndrina (in the case of a small town) or several  'ndrine, if more than one  'ndrina operates in the same town. In the case of larger cities a local may rule over a certain area or neighbourhood of the city. In some contexts a  'ndrina is more powerful than the locale on which they formally depend.

Each locale has a boss with authority over members' life and death, a capo locale, usually the capobastone of a 'ndrina. It has at least 49 members and besides the capo locale, there is the contabile  (accountant) who handles the finances - commonly called la bacinella or la valigetta (briefcase) - and a crimine that oversees the illegal activity. All three form a triumvirate called the Copiata. A locale is often subdivided into two divisions: the società minore (the "minor" or lower society) and the società maggiore ("major" or higher society). The minor is submissive to the major.

The locale of San Luca has a historical preeminence. Every new group or locale must obtain its authorization to operate and every group belonging to the 'Ndrangheta "still has to deposit a small percentage of illicit proceeds to the principale of San Luca in recognition of the latter's primordial supremacy."

References 

  Gratteri, Nicola & Antonio Nicaso (2006). Fratelli di sangue, Cosenza: Pellegrini Editore, 
 Nicaso, Antonio & Marcel Danesi (2013). Made Men: Mafia Culture and the Power of Symbols, Rituals, and Myth, Rowman & Littlefield Publishers, 
 Paoli, Letizia (2003). Mafia Brotherhoods: Organized Crime, Italian Style, New York: Oxford University Press  (Review by Klaus Von Lampe) (Review by Alexandra V. Orlova)
 Varese, Federico. How Mafias Migrate: The Case of the 'Ndrangheta in Northern Italy, Discussion Papers in Economic and Social History, Number 59, University of Oxford, July 2005

History of the 'Ndrangheta
Organized crime terminology
Italian words and phrases